Singam Subhash Singh (born 1989) is an Indian professional footballer who plays as a winger for indian club Sagolband United.

Youth career
Subhash had to choose between football or weight-lifting as a career option, his father preferred him to follow the latter, but his family backed him to become a footballer after impressive performances in village tournaments as a kid. He would join the Sports Authority of India at Manipur in 2005 at 15 and spend two years honing his skills before playing for ESU, a Manipuri football club.

Senior career

Air India
It was soon after his first year with his club in Manipur that his cousin Samson Singh recognizing the potential Subhash had, invited him for a trial with Air-India. The striker impressed the Pilots and was soon signed by the club for their senior team. He enjoyed great success in his two-year stint with the Mumbai-based club and even finished as second top scorer amongst Indians in his second season at the I-League club.

East Bengal
Subhash moved to Kolkata giants East Bengal in 2009, with whom he spent a season during which he also made his India U23 debut.

Pune
After a short unsuccessful 6-month spell at Salgaocar in 2010, he was loaned out to Pune for the second half of the 2010–11 I-League. His speed and dribbling skills added a new dimension to Pune FC’s playing style and he soon became a crowd favorite. With his loan signing proving to be a success, Derrick Pereira was quick to sign him permanently at the end of the season. Subhash repaid the faith shown in him by the Pune FC management by scoring the goals that helped the club to a top-5 finish. His on-field performances won him the "Young Player of the Year 2011-12″.

Shillong Lajong
In June 2013, Singh signed a one-year deal with Shillong Lajong. He made his debut for Lajong in the I-League on 22 September 2013 against Dempo at the Duler Stadium in which he came on as a substitute for Uilliams in the 73rd minute as Shillong Lajong won the match 0-3.

Mumbai City
In October 2014, Subhash joined Indian Super League team Mumbai City for 2014 season. He scored his first goal on 18 October 2014 against FC Pune City in 5–0 win.

Bharat FC (loan)
Subhash signed for newly promoted I-League club Bharat FC for the 2014-2015 season on loan from Mumbai City.

Mohun Bagan (loan)
In June 2015 Subhash was signed by Mohun Bagan on loan for the 2015–16 I-League season.

References

External links
 

Living people
Indian footballers
Association football forwards
Association football wingers
Shillong Lajong FC players
Pune FC players
Bharat FC players
I-League players
Mumbai City FC players
Mohun Bagan AC players
NEROCA FC players
Real Kashmir FC players
Indian Super League players
Footballers from Manipur
India youth international footballers
1990 births
East Bengal Club players
Salgaocar FC players
Mohammedan SC (Kolkata) players
Gokulam Kerala FC players